The Second Siege of Veracruz was a military encounter of the Reform War which took place around Veracruz, Mexico in 1860. Conservative President Miguel Miramon besieged the Liberal capital, Veracruz, for over a month but was compelled to withdraw after he ran out of ammunition. Part of his problem was that he was unable to blockade the port by sea due to the intervention of the United States off Antón Lizardo.

References

Conflicts in 1860
1860 in Mexico
History of Mexico
Reform War